= Rose and the Burma Sky =

2023 historical novel by Rosanna Amaka

Rose and the Burma Sky: The Heartrending Unrequited Love Story of a Black Soldier in the Second World War is a historical fiction novel by Rosanna Amaka published in 2023 by Doubleday. It follows the life of Obi, a Nigerian enlisted into the Army during the Second World War in order to survive with Rose, a woman he loves. Things take a tragic turn when Obi discovers that Rose is pregnant for another man.

Lucy Popescu of The Guardian reviewed that Amaka's "[r]epetition occasionally slows the narrative and she has a tendency to inform us of her characters' feelings rather than allow their actions to speak for them" and she praised her view on racism and wasted life of the war.
